The Troy Haymakers were an American basketball team based in Troy, New York, that was a member of the American Basketball League.

After its first season the team became known as the Troy Celtics. During the first half of the 1939/40 season, the team absorbed the Kingston Colonials on December 19, 1939. During the first half of the 1940/41 season, the team moved to Brooklyn and became the Brooklyn Celtics.

Year-by-year

Basketball teams in New York (state)

Defunct basketball teams in the United States
Basketball teams established in 1938
Basketball teams disestablished in 1941
1938 establishments in New York (state)
1941 disestablishments in New York (state)